Wittichen is a village that belongs to Kaltbrunn in the municipality of Schenkenzell in the district of Rottweil in the southwest German state of Baden-Württemberg.

History 
In 1291, Luitgard, later the founder of the convent of Wittichen Abbey, was born in Wittichen. The abbey was founded in 1324. In 1498 Wittichen fell into the hands of the Swabian princes of Fürstenberg. The first attempt to close the convent was in 1540. In 1643 it was destroyed and its rebuilding took until 1681. During the Napoleonic era, Wittichen was secularised in 1803 and went to the Grand Duchy of Baden in 1806.

Economy 
There was mining in Wittichen for centuries.

Sights 

 Wittichen Abbey with its convent museum, exhibits on the history of the monastery and mining
 Several spoil heaps from the days of mining still exist and some are accessible
 Geological Educational Path, Wittichen

Trails 
 Hansjakob Way I
 Gengenbach–Alpirsbach Trail

Events 
On the second Sunday in October is the Luitgard Festival and statt.

Sons and daughters of the municipality 
 Johann Baptist Weiß (1753–1800), Benedictine monk at St. Blaise Abbey

References

External links 

Villages in Baden-Württemberg
Rottweil (district)